Hapalosphaeria deformans is an ascomycete fungus. It is the causal organism of Stamen Blight of caneberry. It is a common disease in Pacific Northwest of North America (especially west of the Cascades, especially in Oregon), elsewhere in Canada, Denmark, Germany, Great Britain, Ireland, and Spain. It affects the commercial harvest of Oregon dewberries, and boysenberries and cascadeberries in British Columbia. It is not commercially significant in red raspberry in Scotland.

Hosts
Caneberries are hosts. Among cane species, known domesticated hosts are blackberry, boysenberry, cascadeberry, evergreen blackberry, loganberry, red raspberry, and youngberry, and nine wild Rubus including wild red raspberry.

See also 
 List of caneberries diseases

References

External links 
 Index Fungorum
 USDA ARS Fungal Database

Ascomycota enigmatic taxa
Fungal plant pathogens and diseases